Josefin Kristin Pettersson (born January 13, 1984)  is an ice hockey player from Sweden. She won a bronze medal at the 2002 Winter Olympics.

References 

1984 births
Living people
Ice hockey players at the 2002 Winter Olympics
Olympic ice hockey players of Sweden
Swedish women's ice hockey players
Olympic medalists in ice hockey
Olympic bronze medalists for Sweden
Medalists at the 2002 Winter Olympics